NGC 3259 is a barred spiral galaxy located approximately 90 million light-years from Earth, in the Ursa Major constellation. It has the morphological classification SAB(rs)bc, which indicates that it is a spiral galaxy with a weak bar across the nucleus (SAB), an incomplete inner ring structure circling the bar (rs), and moderate to loosely wound spiral arms (bc). This galaxy is a known source of X-ray emission and it has an active galactic nucleus of the Seyfert 2 type.

References 

Barred spiral galaxies
3259
17910403
Ursa Major (constellation)
031145